Shotgun is a crime novel by American writer Ed McBain. It is the 23rd book in his 87th Precinct series.

Reception
The New York Times Book Review wrote that Shotgun was similar to McBain's previous book, Fuzz, in its more lighthearted approach to the police procedural. However, the reviewer, Allen Hubin, found the work inferior, with a fragmented plot and the humor not as funny. Nevertheless, Hubin said it compared favorable with other recent "fun novels".

References

1969 American novels
American crime novels
Novels by Evan Hunter